H. Mallawathanthre (full name and details unknown) was a Sri Lankan cricketer. He was a right-handed batsman who played for Nondescripts Cricket Club.

Mallawathanthre made a single first-class appearance for the side, during the 1992–93 season, against Kandy Cricket Club. From the lower-middle order, he scored a duck in the first innings in which he batted, and 22 not out in the second.

External links
H. Mallawathanthre at Cricket Archive 

Sri Lankan cricketers
Nondescripts Cricket Club cricketers
Living people
Year of birth missing (living people)